Charlie Appleby may refer to:

Charlie Appleby (racehorse trainer) (born 1975), British racehorse trainer
Charlie Appleby (speedway rider) (1913–1946), Canadian speedway rider